The Pennsylvania Dutch, also known as Pennsylvania Germans, are a German cultural group native to Pennsylvania and other American states. They descend from Germans who settled during the 17th, 18th and 19th centuries, primarily from the Palatinate, but also from other German-speaking areas, such as Baden-Württemberg, Hesse, Saxony, and Rhineland in Germany as well as the Netherlands, Switzerland, and France's Alsace-Lorraine region.

The ancestors of the Pennsylvania Dutch spoke several south German dialects, particularly Palatine German; the intermixing of English, Palatine, and other German dialects formed the Pennsylvania Dutch language as it is spoken today.

Historically, "Dutch" referred to all Germanic dialect speakers (e.g. Palatine, Swiss), and is the origin of the group's name in English, the Pennsylvania "Dutch". The Pennsylvania Dutch name has caused confusion in recent times, as the word "Dutch" has evolved to associate mainly with people from the Netherlands.

The Pennsylvania Dutch maintained numerous religious affiliations; the greatest number are Lutheran or German Reformed with a lesser number of Anabaptists, including Mennonites, Amish, and Brethren. The Anabaptist groups espoused a simple lifestyle, and their adherents were known as Plain Dutch; this contrasted with the Fancy Dutch, mostly of the Catholic, Lutheran, or Evangelical and Reformed churches, who tended to assimilate more easily into the American mainstream. By the late 1700s, other denominations were also represented in smaller numbers.

The Pennsylvania Dutch Country, Pennsylvania Amish Country, and the Ohio Amish Country are heavily associated with them.

Etymology
The word Dutch in Pennsylvania Dutch is not a mistranslation but rather a derivation of the Pennsylvania Dutch endonym , which means "Pennsylvania Dutch" or "German". Ultimately, the terms Deitsch, Dutch, Diets and Deutsch are all descendants of the Proto-Germanic word , meaning "popular" or "of the people".

Dutch in the English language originally referred to all Germanic language speakers. New Englanders referred to the Netherlandic Dutch language spoken by the New York and Jersey Dutch as Low Dutch, and the Palatine Dutch language spoken in Pennsylvania & New York as High Dutch.

The oldest German newspaper in Pennsylvania was the High Dutch Pennsylvania Journal in 1743. The first mixed English and German paper, the Pennsylvania Gazette of 1751, described itself as an "English and Dutch gazette," in reference to the High Dutch language spoken in Pennsylvania.

Pennsylvania Dutch history in America

Waves of colonial Palatines from the Rhenish Palatinate, one of the Holy Roman states, settled in the Province of New York and the Province of Pennsylvania. The first Palatines arrived in the late 1600s but the majority came throughout the 1700s; they were known collectively as the Palatine Dutch. Many of their descendants settled other states, including Indiana and Ohio. For many years, the term "Palatine" meant German American.

Even more Palatines arrived during the course of the 1800s; many chose to live in big industrial cities such as Germantown, Philadelphia and Pittsburgh, while others who sought large tracts of good farmland moved to midwestern states, where they built new homes in the fertile regions of Illinois, Indiana, and Ohio.

The Palatine Dutch of New York and Pennsylvania continued to use their language as a way of distinguishing themselves from later (post-1830) waves of German-speaking immigrants to the United States. The Pennsylvania Dutch referred to themselves as Deitsche, while immigrants of German-speaking countries and territories were called Deitschlenner, (literally "Dutchlanders", compare ), which translates to  "European Germans", whom they saw as a distinct group.

These European Germans immigrated to Pennsylvania Dutch cities, where many came to prominence in matters of the church, newspapers and urban business. After the 1871 unification of the first German Empire, the term "Dutchlander" came to refer to the nationality of people from the Pennsylvania Dutch Country.

After World War II, the use of Pennsylvania Dutch language declined in favor of English, except among the more insular and tradition-bound Plain people, such as the Old Order Amish and Old Order Mennonites. A number of German cultural practices continue to this day, and German Americans remain the largest ancestry group claimed in Pennsylvania by people in the census.

Geography
The Pennsylvania Dutch live primarily in the Delaware Valley and in the Pennsylvania Dutch Country, a large area that includes South Central Pennsylvania, in the area stretching in an arc from Bethlehem and Allentown in the Lehigh Valley westward through Reading, Lebanon, and Lancaster to York and Chambersburg. Some Pennsylvania Dutch live in the historically Pennsylvania Dutch-speaking areas of Maryland, North Carolina, and Virginia's Shenandoah Valley.

Pennsylvania Dutch nationality

History of the Palatines and other ancestors

The vast majority of Pennsylvania Dutch have Palatine ancestry. They are also culturally related to the New York Dutch.

The Fancy Dutch descend from Palatines who left the economic conditions and devastation in the Rhenish Palatinate of the Holy Roman Empire after the Thirty Years' War; their number included Catholic Palatines, who had already established three Catholic parishes in 1757.

The Plain Dutch are descendants of refugees who left religious persecution in the Netherlands and the Electoral Palatinate. Of note, the Amish and Mennonites came to the Rhenish Palatinate and surrounding areas from Switzerland, where, as Anabaptists, they were persecuted, and so their stay in the Palatinate was of limited duration.

Anglo-Americans held much anti-Palatine sentiment in the Pennsylvania Colony. Below is a quotation of Benjamin Franklin's complaints about the Palatine refugees in his work Observations Concerning the Increase of Mankind (1751):

The great Palatine migration and colonial Palatines

The devastation of the Thirty Years' War (1618–1648) and subsequent wars between the Holy Roman Empire and France triggered massive Palatine emigration from the Rhine area. Immigrants to British America first founded the borough of Germantown in northwest Philadelphia County, Pennsylvania, in 1683. They settled on land sold to them by William Penn. Germantown included not only Mennonites but also Quakers.

During the War of the Grand Alliance (1688–97), French troops pillaged the Rhenish Palatinate, forcing many Palatines to flee. The war began in 1688 as Louis XIV laid claim to the electorate of the Palatinate. French forces devastated all major cities of the region, including Cologne. By 1697 the war came to a close with the Treaty of Ryswick, now Rijswijk in the Netherlands, and the Palatinate remained free of French control. However, by 1702, the War of the Spanish Succession began, lasting until 1713. French expansionism forced many Palatines to flee as refugees.
 
This group of Mennonites was organized by Francis Daniel Pastorius, an agent for a land purchasing company based in Frankfurt am Main. None of the Frankfurt Company ever came to Pennsylvania except Pastorius himself, but thirteen Low Dutch (South Guelderish-speaking) Mennonite families from Krefeld arrived on October 6, 1683, in Philadelphia. They were joined by eight Low Dutch families from Hamburg-Altona in 1700 and five High Dutch families from the Rhenish Palatinate in 1707.

In 1723, some thirty-three Palatine families, dissatisfied under Governor Hunter's rule, migrated from Schoharie, New York, along the Susquehanna River to Tulpehocken, Berks County, Pennsylvania, where other Palatines had settled. They became farmers and used intensive German farming techniques that proved highly productive.

Another wave of settlers from the Holy Roman Empire, which would eventually coalesce to form a large part of the Pennsylvania Dutch, arrived between 1727 and 1775; some sixty-five thouand Palatines landed in Philadelphia in that era and others landed at other ports. Another wave from the Palatinate arrived 1749–1754. More than half of their number was sold into indentured servitude. These indentured servants became known as "Redemptioners" as they would "redeem" their freedom after some years.

The majority originated in what is today southwestern Germany, i.e., Rhineland-Palatinate and Baden-Württemberg; other prominent groups were Alsatians, Dutch, French Huguenots (French Protestants), Moravians from Bohemia and Moravia and Swiss Germans.

The Pennsylvania Dutch during the American Revolutionary War

The Pennsylvania Dutch composed nearly half of the population of the Province of Pennsylvania. The Fancy Dutch population generally supported the Patriot cause in the American Revolution; the nonviolent Plain Dutch minority did not fight in the war. Heinrich Miller of the Holy Roman Principality of Waldeck (1702-1782), was a journalist and printer based in Philadelphia, and published an early German translation of the Declaration of Independence (1776) in his newspaper Philadelphische Staatsbote. Miller, having Swiss ancestry, often wrote about Swiss history and myth, such as the William Tell legend, to provide a context for patriot support in the conflict with Britain.

Frederick Muhlenberg (1750–1801), a Lutheran pastor, became a major patriot and politician, rising to be elected as Speaker of the U.S. House of Representatives.

Pennsylvania Dutch Provost Corps
Pennsylvania Dutch were recruited for the American Provost corps under Captain Bartholomew von Heer, a Prussian who had served in a similar unit in Europe before immigrating to Reading, Pennsylvania prior to the war. During the Revolutionary War the Marechaussee Corps were utilized in a variety of ways, including intelligence gathering, route security, enemy prisoner of war operations, and even combat during the Battle of Springfield. The Marechausee also provided security for Washington's headquarters during the Battle of Yorktown, acted as his security detail, and was one of the last units deactivated after the Revolutionary War.  The Marechaussee Corps was often not well received by the Continental Army, due in part to their defined duties but also due to the fact that some members of the corps spoke little or no English.  Six of the provosts had even been Hessian prisoners of war prior to their recruitment.  Because the provost corps completed many of the same functions as the modern U.S. Military Police Corps, it is considered a predecessor of the current United States Military Police Regiment.

Hessians in the Pennsylvania Dutch Country

 
 
Hesse-Kassel signed a treaty of alliance with Great Britain to supply fifteen regiments, four grenadier battalions, two jäger companies, and three companies of artillery. The jägers in particular were carefully recruited and well paid, well clothed, and free from manual labor.  These jägers proved essential in the "Indian style" warfare in America.

German-speaking armies could not quickly replace men lost on the other side of the Atlantic, so the Hessians recruited Black people as soldiers who became known as Black Hessians. There were one hundred and fifteen Black soldiers serving with Hessian units, most of them as drummers or fifers.

General Washington's Continental Army had crossed the Delaware River to make a surprise attack on the Hessians in the early morning of December 26, 1776. In the Battle of Trenton, the Hessian force of fourteen hundred men was quickly overwhelmed by the Continentals, with only about twenty killed and one hundred wounded, but one thousand captured.

The Hessians captured in the Battle of Trenton were paraded through the streets of Philadelphia to raise American morale; anger at their presence helped the Continental Army recruit new soldiers. Most of the prisoners were sent to work as farmhands.

By early 1778, negotiations for the exchange of prisoners between Washington and the British had begun in earnest. These included Nicholas Bahner(t), Jacob Trobe, George Geisler, and Conrad Grein (Konrad Krain), who were a few of the Hessian soldiers who deserted the British forces after being returned in exchange for American prisoners of war. These men were both hunted by the British for being deserters and by many of the colonists as a foreign enemy.

Throughout the war, Americans tried to entice Hessians to desert the British, emphasizing the large and prosperous German-American community. The U.S. Congress authorized the offer of land of up to fifty acres (roughly twenty hectares) to individual Hessian soldiers who switched sides. British soldiers were offered fifty to eight hundred acres, depending on rank.

Many Hessian prisoners were held in camps at the interior city of Lancaster, home to a large German community known as the Pennsylvania Dutch. Hessian prisoners were subsequently treated well, with some volunteering for extra work assignments, helping to replace local men serving in the Continental Army. Due to shared German heritage and abundance of land, many Hessian soldiers stayed and settled in the Pennsylvania Dutch Country after the war's end.

Fancy Dutch

The Fancy Dutch came to control much of the best agricultural lands in all of the Pennsylvania Commonwealth. They ran many newspapers, and out of six newspapers in Pennsylvania, three were in German, two were in English and one was in both languages. They also maintained their Germanic architecture when they founded new towns in Pennsylvania.

Members of the Pennsylvania Dutch community already possessed an ethnic identity and a well-defined social-system that was separate from the Anglo-American identity. Their Anglo-American neighbors described them as very industrious, very businessminded, and a very rich community.

Here is a conversation of two businessmen describing Germantown, the capital of Pennsylvania Dutch urban culture in 1854:

The Pennsylvania Dutch had a strong dislike for New England, and to them the term "Yankee" became synonymous with "a cheat." Indeed, New Englanders were the rivals of the Pennsylvania Dutch.

Fancy Dutch religion and Anglo-American prejudice 

As the descendants of Palatines, Fancy Dutch people were mostly of Lutheran and Reformed church congregations (non-sectarians), as well as Roman Catholics. They were therefore often called "Church Dutch" or "Church people," as distinguished from so-called sectarians (Anabaptist Plain people), along the lines of a high church/low church distinction.

Anglo-Americans created the stereotypes of "the stubborn Dutchman" or "the dumb Dutchman", and made Pennsylvania Dutch the butt of ethnic jokes in the 18th, 19th, and 20th centuries, though these stereotypes were never specific to the Plain Folk; most of the Pennsylvania Dutch people in those centuries were Church people. Here is Pennsylvania Dutch Professor Daniel Miller's argument against the "Dumb Dutch" stereotype:

The prejudice is now mostly a fossil of the past, the subject of consciously clichéd jokes rather than true spite or discord ("laughing with rather than laughing at"), now that assimilation is widespread. Just as Fancy Dutch or their descendants no longer speak the Pennsylvania Dutch language with any regularity (or at all, in many cases), they are not necessarily religious anymore, meaning that calling them "Church Dutch" is no longer particularly apt, although even among those that no longer regularly attend any church, many remain cultural Christians.

The Pennsylvania Dutch during the Civil War

 

Nearly all of the regiments from Pennsylvania that fought in the American Civil War had German-speaking or Pennsylvania Dutch-speaking members on their rosters. Only a few of the Plain Dutch, Amish & Mennonites, enlisted, but the vast majority refused to fight in the war. Almost all Pennsylvania Dutch soldiers who enlisted were Fancy Dutch.

Some regiments like the 153rd Pennsylvania Volunteer Infantry were entirely composed of Pennsylvania Dutch soldiers. The 47th Pennsylvania Infantry Regiment also had a high percentage of German immigrants and Pennsylvania-born men of German heritage on its rosters; the regiment's K Company was formed with the intent of it being an "all-German company."

Here is the letter of a Pennsylvania Dutch soldier from the 149th Pennsylvania Volunteer Infantry:

Pennsylvania Dutch companies sometimes mixed with English companies. (The Pennsylvania Dutch had the habit of labeling anyone who did not speak Pennsylvania Dutch "English.") Many of the Pennsylvania Dutch soldiers who fought in the Civil War were recruited and trained at Camp Curtin, Pennsylvania.

Pennsylvania Dutch regiments composed a large portion of the Federal Forces who fought in the Battle of Gettysburg at Gettysburg, Pennsylvania, the bloodiest battle of the Civil War.

Pennsylvania Dutch during World War II
A platoon of Pennsylvania Dutch soldiers on patrol in Germany was once spared from being machine-gunned by Nazi soldiers who listened to them approaching. The Germans heard them speaking Pennsylvania Dutch amongst each other and assumed that they were natives of the Palatinate.

Black Pennsylvania Dutch

Historically, a significant number of Black and Indian people have identified with Pennsylvania Dutch culture, with many of the Pennsylvania Dutch diaspora being Melungeons calling themselves Black Dutch.

In colonial Pennsylvania, Palatines lived between Iroquois settlements and the two peoples "communicated, drank, worked, worshipped and traded together, negotiated over land use and borders, and conducted their diplomacy separate from the colonial governments". Some Palatines learned to perform the Haudenosaunee condolence ceremony, where condolences were offered to those whose friends and family had died, which was the most important of all Iroquois rituals. The Canadian historian James Paxton wrote the Palatines and Haudenosaunee "visited each other's homes, conducted small-scale trade and socialized in taverns and trading posts".

Relations between the Palatine Dutch and Indians were friendly. The descendants of the Palatine Dutch and Indians were known as Black Dutch.

Slavery in Pennsylvania
Many Black people of the Pennsylvania Dutch Country spoke Pennsylvania Dutch. Enslaved Black people cohabitating with Pennsylvania Dutch learned the Pennsylvania Dutch language; as slavery was abolished in Pennsylvania, the free Black Dutch population grew.

The Pennsylvania Dutch had been the first outspoken community against slavery, beginning with the community of Germantown and its founder Francis Daniel Pastorius, who organized antislavery protests in 1688. Pastorius and citizens of Germantown criticized the racial lines of slavery and expounded that slavery was wrong no matter what descent or color people were.

The Pennsylvania Dutch shared similar experiences with enslaved Black people; more than half of all Palatine refugees who came to Pennsylvania were purchased on lengthy indentured servitude contracts by colonial New Englanders. These indentured servants, known as redemptioners, were made to work on plantations; Palatine redemptioners had a high death rate, and many didn't live long enough to see the end of their contract.

Canada Black Dutch
In Canada, an 1851 census shows many Black people and Mennonites lived near each other in a number of places and exchanged labor; the Dutch would also hire Black laborers. There were also accounts of Black families providing childcare assistance for their Dutch neighbors. These Pennsylvania Dutch were usually Plain Dutch Mennonites or Fancy Dutch Lutherans. The Black-Mennonite relationship in Canada soon evolved to the level of church membership.

Migration to Canada

An early group, mainly from the Roxborough-Germantown area of Pennsylvania, emigrated to then colonial Nova Scotia in 1766 and founded the Township of Monckton, site of present-day Moncton, New Brunswick. The extensive Steeves clan descends from this group.

After the American Revolution, John Graves Simcoe, lieutenant governor of Upper Canada, invited Americans, including Mennonites and German Baptist Brethren, to settle in British North American territory and offered tracts of land to immigrant groups. This resulted in communities of Pennsylvania Dutch speakers emigrating to Canada, many to the area called the German Company Tract, a subset of land within the Haldimand Tract, in the Township of Waterloo, which later became Waterloo County, Ontario. Some still live in the area around Markham, Ontario, and particularly in the northern areas of the current Waterloo Region. Some members of the two communities formed the Markham-Waterloo Mennonite Conference. Today, the Pennsylvania Dutch language is mostly spoken by Old Order Mennonites.

From 1800 to the 1830s, some Mennonites in Upstate New York and Pennsylvania moved north to Canada, primarily to the area that would become Cambridge, Kitchener/Waterloo and St. Jacobs/Elmira in Waterloo County, Ontario, plus the Listowel area adjacent to the northwest. Settlement started in 1800 by Joseph Schoerg and Samuel Betzner, Jr. (brothers-in-law), Mennonites, from Franklin County, Pennsylvania. Other settlers followed mostly from Pennsylvania typically by Conestoga wagons. Many of the pioneers arriving from Pennsylvania after November 1803 bought land in a sixty thousand-acre section established by a group of Mennonites from Lancaster County Pennsylvania, called the German Company Lands.

Fewer of the Pennsylvania Dutch settled in what would later become the Greater Toronto Area in areas that would later be the towns of Altona, Ontario, Pickering, Ontario, and especially Markham Village, Ontario, and Stouffville, Ontario. Peter Reesor and brother-in-law Abraham Stouffer were higher profile settlers in Markham and Stouffville.

William Berczy, a German entrepreneur and artist, had settled in upstate New York and in May 1794, he was able to obtain sixty-four acres in Markham Township, near the current city of Toronto. Berczy arrived with approximately one hundred and ninety German families from Pennsylvania and settled here. Others later moved to other locations in the general area, including a hamlet they founded, German Mills, Ontario, named for its grist mill; that community is now called Thornhill, Ontario, in the township that is now part of York Region.

Pennsylvania Dutch today 

Pennsylvania Dutch culture is still prevalent in some parts of Pennsylvania today. The Pennsylvania Dutch today speak English, though some still speak the Pennsylvania Dutch language among themselves.  They share cultural similarities with the Mennonites in the same area. Pennsylvania Dutch English retains some German grammar and literally translated vocabulary, some phrases include "outen or out'n the lights" meaning "turn off the lights", "it's gonna make wet" meaning "its going to rain", and "its all" meaning "its all gone". They also sometimes leave out the verb in phrases turning "the trash needs to go out" in to "the trash needs out", in alignment with German grammar. The Pennsylvania Dutch have some foods that are uncommon outside of places where they live. Some of these include shoo-fly pie, funnel cake, pepper cabbage, filling and jello salads such as strawberry pretzel salad.

Religion

Christianity
Among immigrants from the 1600s and 1700s, those known as the Pennsylvania Dutch included Mennonites, Swiss Brethren (also called Mennonites by the locals) and Amish but also Anabaptist-Pietists such as German Baptist Brethren and those who belonged to German Lutheran or German Reformed Church congregations. Other settlers of that era were of the Moravian Church while a few were Seventh Day Baptists. Calvinist Palatines and several other denominations were also represented to a lesser extent.

Over sixty percent of the immigrants who arrived in Pennsylvania from Germany or Switzerland in the 1700s and 1800s were Lutherans and they maintained good relations with those of the German Reformed Church. The two groups founded Franklin College (now Franklin & Marshall College) in 1787.

Henry Muhlenberg (1711–1787) founded the Lutheran Church in America. He organized the Ministerium of Pennsylvania in 1748, set out the standard organizational format for new churches and helped shape Lutheran liturgy.

Muhlenberg was sent by the Lutheran bishops in Germany, and he always insisted on strict conformity to Lutheran dogma. Muhlenberg's view of church unity was in direct opposition to Nicolaus Ludwig Zinzendorf's Moravian Church approach, with its goal of uniting various Pennsylvania German religious groups under a less rigid "Congregation of God in the Spirit". The differences between the two approaches led to permanent impasse between Lutherans and Moravians, especially after a December 1742 meeting in Philadelphia. The Moravians settled Bethlehem and nearby areas and established schools for Native Americans.

Judaism
In Pennsylvania, Pennsylvania Dutch Christians and Pennsylvania German Jews have often maintained a special relationship due to their common German language and cultural heritage. Because both Yiddish and the Pennsylvania Dutch language are High German languages, there are strong similarities between the two languages and a limited degree of mutual intelligibility. Historically, Pennsylvania Dutch Christians and Pennsylvania German Jews often had overlapping bonds in German-American business and community life. Due to this historical bond there are several mixed-faith cemeteries in Lehigh County, including Allentown's Fairview Cemetery, where German-Americans of both the Jewish and Protestant faiths are buried. The cooking of Pennsylvania German Christians and Pennsylvania German Jews often overlaps, particularly vegetarian dishes that do not contain non-kosher ingredients such as pork or that mix meat and dairy together. In 1987, the First United Church of Christ in Easton, Pennsylvania, hosted the annual meeting of the Pennsylvania German Society, the theme of which was the special bond between Pennsylvania German Christians and Pennsylvania German Jews. German Jews and German Christians held "quite ecumenical philosophies" about interfaith marriage and there are recorded instances of marriages between Jews and Christians within the German community. German Jews arriving in Pennsylvania often integrated into Pennsylvania Dutch communities because of their lack of knowledge of the English language. German Jews often lacked a trade and thus became peddlers, selling their wares within Pennsylvania Dutch society.

A number of Pennsylvanian German Jews migrated to the Shenandoah Valley, traveling along the same route of migration as other Pennsylvania Dutch people.

Notable people

 Jacob Albright (1759–1808), founder of the Evangelical Association
 Anne F. Beiler (1949–present), founder of Auntie Anne's Pretzels
 John Birmelin (1873–1950), poet, playwright
 Solomon DeLong (1849–1925), writer, journalist
 George Ege (1748–1829), Representative for Pennsylvania
 Dwight D. Eisenhower (1890–1969), 34th President of the United States
 H. L. Fischer (1822–1909), writer, translator
 Heinrich Funck (c. 1697–1730), miller, author, Mennonite bishop
 John Fries (1750–1818), auctioneer, organizer of Fries's Rebellion
 Betty Groff (1935–2015), celebrity chef, cookbook author
 Michael Hillegas (1729–1804), first Treasurer of the United States
 Hedda Hopper (1885–1966), actress, gossip columnist
 Ralph Kiner  (1922–2014), Hall of Fame baseball player and Pittsburgh Pirates and New York Mets legend.
 William Kohl (1820–1892), sea captain, shipowner, shipbuilder, businessman
 Stephen Miller (1816–1881), 4th Governor of Minnesota
 Bodo Otto (1711–1787), physician in the Continental Army
 Harry Hess Reichard (1878–1956), writer, scholar
 Joseph Ritner (1780–1869), 8th Governor of Pennsylvania
 Victor Schertzinger (1888–1941), composer, film director, producer, screenwriter
 Evelyn Ay Sempier (1933–2008), Miss America 1954
 Francis R. Shunk (1788–1848), 10th Governor of Pennsylvania
 Simon Snyder (1759–1813), 3rd Governor of Pennsylvania
 Clement Studebaker (1831–1901), co-founder of Studebaker Corporation
 Clement Studebaker Jr. (1871–1932), businessman, son of Clement Studebaker Sr.
 John Studebaker (1833–1917), co-founder of Studebaker Corporation
 Conrad Weiser (1696–1760),  colonial diplomat between Pennsylvania and Native American nations.

See also

List of Amish and their descendants
 German American
 Preston Barba, historian and linguist
 Helen Reimensnyder Martin, author
 Anna Balmer Myers, author
 Michael Werner (publisher)
 John Schmid, singer
 Fraktur (Pennsylvania German folk art)
 Hex sign
 Hiwwe wie Driwwe newspaper
 Kurrent handwriting
 Schwenkfeldian (church)
 Old German Baptist Brethren (church)
 Pow-wow

Notes

References

Bibliography
 Bronner, Simon J.  and Joshua R. Brown, eds. Pennsylvania Germans: An Interpretive Encyclopedia (: Johns Hopkins UP, 2017), xviii, 554 pp.
 
 
 Grubb, Farley. "German Immigration to Pennsylvania, 1709 to 1820", Journal of Interdisciplinary History Vol. 20, No. 3 (Winter, 1990), pp. 417–436 in JSTOR
 Louden, Mark L. Pennsylvania Dutch: The Story of an American Language. Baltimore, MD: Johns Hopkins University Press, 2016.
 McMurry, Sally, and Nancy Van Dolsen, eds. Architecture and Landscape of the Pennsylvania Germans, 1720–1920 (University of Pennsylvania Press; 2011) 250 studies their houses, churches, barns, outbuildings, commercial buildings, and landscapes
 Nolt, Steven, Foreigners in Their Own Land: Pennsylvania Germans in the Early American Republic, Penn State U. Press, 2002 
 Pochmann, Henry A. German Culture in America: Philosophical and Literary Influences 1600–1900 (1957). 890pp; comprehensive review of German influence on Americans esp 19th century. online
 Pochmann, Henry A. and  Arthur R. Schult.  Bibliography of German Culture in America to 1940 (2nd ed 1982); massive listing, but no annotations. 
 Roeber, A. G. Palatines, Liberty, and Property: German Lutherans in Colonial British America (1998)
 Roeber, A. G. "In German Ways? Problems and Potentials of Eighteenth-Century German Social and Emigration History", William & Mary Quarterly, Oct 1987, Vol. 44 Issue 4, pp 750–774 in JSTOR

External links

 
 The Pennsylvania German Society
 Lancaster County tourism website
 Overview of Pennsylvania German Culture
 German-American Heritage Museum of the USA in Washington, DC
 "Why the Pennsylvania German still prevails in the eastern section of the State", by George Mays, M.D.. Reading, Pa., Printed by Daniel Miller, 1904
 The Schwenkfelder Library & Heritage Center
 FamilyHart Pennsylvania Dutch Genealogy Family Pages and Database
 Alsatian Roots of Pennsylvania Dutch Firestones
 Pennsylvania Dutch Family History, Genealogy, Culture, and Life
 Several digitized books on Pennsylvania Dutch arts and crafts, design, and prints from The Metropolitan Museum of Art Libraries

 In Pennsylvania German
 Deitscherei.org—Fer der Deitsch Wandel
 Hiwwe wie Driwwe—The Pennsylvania German Newspaper
 Pennsylvania German Encyclopedia

 
 
German-Canadian culture in Ontario
Amish in Pennsylvania
Culture of Lancaster, Pennsylvania
Culture of Ontario
European-American society
German diaspora in North America
German-Jewish culture in Pennsylvania
Indiana culture
Maryland culture
Mennonitism in Pennsylvania
North Carolina culture
Ohio culture
Pennsylvania Dutch culture
Virginia culture
West Virginia culture
Pennsylvania culture